Robert Bromley (1815–1850) was a British politician.

Robert Bromley may also refer to:

Bob Bromley, Canadian politician
Bob Bromley (Missouri politician) (born 1952/53), American politician
Sir Robert Howe Bromley, 3rd Baronet (1778–1857), of the Bromley baronets
Sir Robert Bromley, 6th Baronet (1874–1906), of the Bromley baronets

See also
Bromley (disambiguation)